Todd Hollenshead was President and CEO of id Software while the company put out some of the gaming world’s most iconic video game franchises: Doom, Quake, Wolfenstein, and Rage. In addition to his software work, he is also known in the gaming community for his long hair and his role as "MC" at Quakecon, a LAN party and gaming convention in Dallas, Texas.

Hollenshead joined id Software in November 1996.  He stayed on as President of id after it was acquired by ZeniMax in 2009, but left the company in 2013.

In February 2018, Hollenshead took a leadership role at Nerve Software. 

In November of 2020, after almost three years at Nerve Software, Todd has taken a position as Head of Publishing at Saber Interactive.

References 

 Kushner, David (2003). Masters of Doom: How Two Guys Created an Empire and Transformed Pop Culture, New York: Random House.  .
 "Interview: Todd Hollenshead" Edge Magazine (February 2010)

External links 
 Hollenshead & Carmack interview from gamesindustry.biz (2008)

American technology chief executives
Living people
Video game businesspeople
Id Software people
Year of birth missing (living people)